Sam Howell (born September 16, 2000) is an American football quarterback for the Washington Commanders of the National Football League (NFL). He played college football at North Carolina, setting school records for most touchdown passes in a single season (38) as well as career passing yards (10,283) and touchdown passes (92). He was drafted by the Commanders in the fifth round of the 2022 NFL Draft.

Early years
Howell was born in Waynesville, North Carolina, on September 16, 2000, and grew up in Union County. He attended and played football for Sun Valley High School, where he threw for 13,415 yards and 145 touchdowns while rushing for 3,621 yards and 60 touchdowns during his time there. 

The second-ranked recruit in North Carolina, Howell originally committed to play college football at Florida State University (FSU) but flipped to the University of North Carolina (UNC) after FSU offensive coordinator Walt Bell left the program to pursue other coaching opportunities and Mack Brown was hired as UNC's head coach.

College career

Freshman

Howell enrolled at the University of North Carolina at Chapel Hill in January 2019. He won an open competition to become the Tar Heels' starting quarterback. He became the first true freshman at the school to win the starting quarterback job in his first year. In his debut, he passed for 245 yards and two touchdowns in a season-opening 24-20 victory over South Carolina. Against NC State, Howell threw for 401 yards and three touchdowns in a 41–10 victory.

Howell finished the regular season completing 234 of 388 passes for 3,347 yards with 35 touchdowns and seven interceptions. He threw for 294 yards and three more touchdowns in the 55–13 win over Temple in the 2019 Military Bowl. He earned Military Bowl MVP honors for his performance, which also included a touchdown reception on a trick play. Howell's 38 touchdown passes was a single-season FBS record for a true freshman quarterback, and he was named ACC Rookie of the Year for his stellar performance that season. His yardage and touchdown totals were also the highest in the conference on the year, earning third-team All-ACC honors in addition.

Sophomore
Howell was included on watchlists for the Maxwell, Manning, and O'Brien awards prior to his sophomore season. He earned ACC Player of the Week honors after throwing for 443 yards against Virginia. Against Wake Forest two weeks later, Howell threw for 550 yards and 6 touchdowns, both school records, while rushing for another touchdown. Howell would record his second career touchdown catch in a 62–26 victory over the Miami Hurricanes. He would finish the season throwing three touchdowns in the Orange Bowl and would earn second-team All-ACC honors in the process. 2020 would be Howell's most successful season as Tar Heel starting quarterback, leading the team to an 8-4 record and a final ranking of 18 in the AP Poll.

Junior
Much like his sophomore year, Howell received significant hype going into his junior campaign, being named to multiple award watchlists, and was also considered one of the top quarterbacks in the nation. Against Georgia State in week two, Howell threw for 352 yards and three touchdowns and rushed for 104 yards and two more scores, becoming the second quarterback in Tar Heel history to throw for over 300 passing yards and 100 rushing yards in the same game. The following week against Virginia, Howell threw for 307 yards and five touchdowns while also rushing for 112 yards, joining Lamar Jackson as the second Power 5 quarterback to post back-to-back games of over 300 passing and 100 rushing yards since 2004.

On the last play of overtime against Pittsburgh, he suffered an injury to his non-throwing shoulder which caused him to miss the following game against Wofford. He made his return the following week in a 34-30 loss to NC State, throwing for 147 yards, one touchdown, and an interception alongside two rushing touchdowns. He finished the season throwing for 3,056 with 24 touchdowns while rushing for 828 yards with 11 touchdowns. He graduated in December 2021 and announced that he would forgo his remaining college eligibility to enter the 2022 NFL Draft. Howell would finish his Tar Heel career throwing for 92 touchdown passes and 10,283 yards, both school records. He threw at least one touchdown pass in every game he played in college.

College statistics

Professional career
Despite predictions of being an early pick in the 2022 NFL Draft, Howell would not be selected until the fifth round when he was drafted 144th overall by the Washington Commanders. He signed his four-year rookie contract on May 6, 2022. Howell started the final game of the 2022 season after the team had been eliminated from playoff contention, completing 11 of 19 passes for 169 yards with a passing and rushing touchdown in a 26–6 upset win against the Dallas Cowboys.

NFL statistics

Personal life
Howell is part Korean; his American grandfather met his Korean grandmother while stationed there in the late 1960s. He has never eaten any beef or seafood, with chicken being the only meat in his diet. Howell is a Christian and was baptized in 2021.

References

External links

 
 Washington Commanders bio
 North Carolina Tar Heels bio

2000 births
American football quarterbacks
American sportspeople of Korean descent
Christians from North Carolina
Living people
North Carolina Tar Heels football players
People from Union County, North Carolina
People from Waynesville, North Carolina
Players of American football from North Carolina
Washington Commanders players